is a Japanese manga series written and illustrated by Keiko Suenobu.

Plot
This manga focuses on Mizuki Konno, a typical high school junior at Yanno Prefectural High School. 
A group of high school girls is on their way to an exchange camp when the bus driver passes out and causes the bus to drop from a cliff. The few survivors gather together and try to survive until rescue arrives.

Live-action
A live-action drama version of the manga aired on TV Tokyo between July 12, 2013, and September 27, 2013.

Cast
 Nanami Sakuraba as Mizuki Konno
 Tao Tsuchiya as Chieko Kamiya
 Rio Yamashita as Arisa Morishige
 Ayano Kudo as Haru Ichinose
 Yuka Masuda as Chikage Usui
 Katsuhiro Suzuki as Haruaki Hinata
 Riho Takada as Sakura Himesawa
 Masataka Kubota as Wataru Igarashi
 Ikkei Watanabe as Hirokazu Konno

A Turkish television series adoption is announced in August 2021.

Reception
Carlo Santos of Anime News Network (ANN) gave volume 1 a B−. Rebecca Silverman, also of ANN, gave it a B.

By July 17, 2011, volume 5 had sold 30,934 copies in Japan. By December 18, 2011, volume 6 had sold 32,754 copies in Japan. In the week of October 14 to 20, 2012, volume 1 ranked in second place in the list of The New York Times Manga Best Sellers. It has sold 10 million copies in Japan.

References

External links
 
TV drama official site

Kodansha manga
Shōjo manga
Suspense anime and manga
TV Tokyo original programming
Vertical (publisher) titles